Margaret Mary Urlich (24 January 1965 – 22 August 2022) was a New Zealand singer who lived in Australia for most of her career. 

Urlich's 1989 debut solo album, Safety in Numbers, won "Breakthrough Artist – Album" at the 1991 ARIA Awards. Its 1992 follow-up, Chameleon Dreams, was also a success. Urlich was successful in both New Zealand and Australia, selling over 400,000 albums during her career, ranking her as one of New Zealand's most successful recording artists. She was the cousin of fellow New Zealand singer Peter Urlich.

Life and career

Urlich began her career as lead vocalist for the new wave band Peking Man with her brother Pat, Tim Calder, Perry Marshall, Jan Foulkes, Neville Hall, John Fearon and Jay F-bula. Peking Man won the 1984 Shazam! Battle of The Bands (a TVNZ pop show) and had a number of hit songs in New Zealand, including "Good Luck to You" (No. 6), "Lift Your Head Up High" (No. 21) and 1985's "Room That Echoes" (No. 1).

Urlich was later a member of an all-girl pop group in New Zealand called When the Cat's Away. Urlich moved to Australia in 1988. She recorded her debut solo studio album, Safety in Numbers, at Studios 301 in Sydney and released it in New Zealand in 1989 and Australia in March 1990. The album peaked at No. 4 on the New Zealand album charts in December 1989 and No. 5 on the Australian album charts in December 1990 and went triple platinum in Australia. Urlich won an ARIA Award in 1991 for "Best Breakthrough Artist".

In 1990, Urlich, then little known outside New Zealand, provided backing vocals on a track for Australian artist Daryl Braithwaite on his second solo album, Rise, which was released in November 1990. The song she featured in was the Rickie Lee Jones ballad "The Horses", which was a No. 1 hit for Braithwaite. The video clip featured Braithwaite singing on a beach, with a model (riding a horse), lip-syncing Urlich's voice. Urlich chose not to appear in Braithwaite's film clip as she had just released Safety in Numbers and was working to establish herself as a solo artist.

In March 1991, Urlich, armed with a half-million-dollar recording budget, returned to the studio to commence pre-production for her second album, Chameleon Dreams, with English writer/producer Robyn Smith, the man behind her highly successful debut. By mid-year, Urlich and Smith had entered Studios 301 to record their two songs, plus a third track written by Smith and Barry Blue. The same team had been responsible for two of the tracks on Safety in Numbers ("Escaping" and "Guilty People") and their latest offering, "Boy in the Moon", proved pivotal to the sound of the new album. Other tracks were collected by travelling around the world.

Urlich went to London to co-write with writers such as Rob Fisher, with whom she wrote the album's title track, "Chameleon Dreams". She then went on to Los Angeles, where she met with Grammy Award-winning writer/producer Ian Prince, with whom she wrote two songs for the album and he produced four tracks. She returned to London, where she co-wrote a number of songs with Simon Law and Tony Swain, before completing the project with three tracks produced by Swain. The success of Chameleon Dreams earned Urlich the "Best Selling New Zealand Artist of the Year" award at the 1992 World Music Awards in Monte Carlo. She attended the awards ceremony and performed "Love Train".

In 1993, Urlich was part of Export Music Australia (EMA) and Austrade's second Wizards of Oz promotion. She toured Japan with fellow singer Rick Price and the group Yothu Yindi. Urlich and Dale Barlow recorded a version of "I've Got You Under My Skin" for Kate Ceberano's 1994 album Kate Ceberano and Friends.

She spent much of 1994 living back in New Zealand and appeared as Mary Magdalene in a major concert production of Andrew Lloyd Webber's rock opera Jesus Christ Superstar. Urlich released a version of "I Don't Know How to Love Him" that reached No. 44 on the New Zealand singles charts.

For her third studio album, The Deepest Blue, Urlich returned to her long-standing partnership with British writer/producer Robyn Smith. She and Smith co-wrote all but two of the tracks on the album. The Deepest Blue was released in August 1995 but failed to have the same impact as her previous two albums, reaching No. 18 on the New Zealand charts and No. 17 on the Australian charts.

In 1998, her contract with Sony Music having expired, she moved to the Southern Highlands of New South Wales where she set up home and a new recording studio with her partner. Here she produced her fourth album, Second Nature, a recording project produced by Eddie Rayner from Split Enz that was recorded on and off over 12 months and involved musicians from Australia and New Zealand. The album comprised cover versions of some of Urlich's favourite New Zealand songs that she grew up with. These included songs from artists such as Split Enz, Crowded House, Dave Dobbyn, Max Merritt, Shona Laing, Don McGlashan and Tim Finn. The album was released in New Zealand in 1999 and reached No. 11 on the charts, achieving platinum status. This was her final studio album.

Urlich made a special guest performance on series 1, episode 6 of The Micallef Program, performing a comical duet of the Carly Simon classic "You're So Vain" with Shaun Micallef. The two had previously performed a comical duet of the Frank and Nancy Sinatra song "Somethin' Stupid", with Micallef in his Milo Kerrigan persona, on the sketch comedy program Full Frontal.

After a two-and-a-half-year struggle with cancer, Urlich died on 22 August 2022, at the age of 57, surrounded by her family at her home in the Southern Highlands.

Discography

Studio albums

Live albums

Singles

Awards and nominations

ARIA Music Awards
The ARIA Music Awards is an annual awards ceremony that recognises excellence, innovation, and achievement across all genres of Australian music. They commenced in 1987.

! 
|-
| rowspan="3" | 1991 || rowspan="3" | Safety in Numbers || Breakthrough Artist – Album ||  || rowspan="6" |
|- 
| Album of the Year ||  
|- 
| Best Female Artist ||  
|- 
| 1993 || Chameleon Dreams || Best Female Artist || 
|- 
| rowspan="2" | 1994 || "Burnt Sienna" || Best Female Artist || 
|- 
| "Where Is the Love?" (with Rick Price) || Best Adult Contemporary Album || 
|-

New Zealand Music Awards
The New Zealand Music Awards are an annual awards night celebrating excellence in New Zealand music and have been presented annually since 1965.

! 
|-
| 1985 || Margaret Urlich || Female Vocalist of the Year ||  || rowspan="10" | 
|-
| 1986 || Margaret Urlich || Female Vocalist of the Year ||  
|-
| rowspan="4" | 1989 || Margaret Urlich || Female Vocalist of the Year ||  
|-
| Safety in Numbers || Album of the Year || 
|-
| Polly Walker and Debbie Watson for Safety in Numbers || Album Cover of the Year ||  
|-
| "Escaping" || Single of the Year ||  
|-
| rowspan="3" | 1990 || Margaret Urlich || Female Vocalist of the Year ||  
|-
| Margaret Urlich || International Achievement || 
|-
| "Number One (Remember When We Danced All Night)" || Single of the Year ||  
|-
| 2000 || Kimberley Renwick for Second Nature || Album Cover of the Year ||  
|-
| 2021 || Margaret Urlich and When the Cats Away' || New Zealand Music Hall of Fame ||  || 
|-

World Music Awards 
The World Music Awards is an international award show founded in 1989 under the patronage of Albert II, Prince of Monaco and co-founder/executive producer John Martinotti.

|-
| 1992 || Margaret Urlich || Best Selling New Zealand Artist of the Year || 
|-

Television appearances

References

External links
Official website (archived at Internet Archive)
 
 
 

1965 births
2022 deaths
ARIA Award winners
New Zealand expatriates in Australia
20th-century New Zealand women singers
Women new wave singers
CBS Records artists
Sony Music New Zealand artists
Musicians from Auckland
Deaths from cancer in New South Wales
21st-century New Zealand women singers